Series 42 of University Challenge began on 16 July 2012 on BBC Two.

It also marked the 50th anniversary of the show’s formation.

Results
 Winning teams are highlighted in bold.
 Teams with green scores (winners) returned in the next round, while those with red scores (losers) were eliminated.
 Teams with orange scores must win one more match to return in the next round (current highest scoring losers, teams that won their first quarter final match, teams that won their second quarter final match having lost their first, or teams that won their first quarter final match and lost their second).
 Teams with yellow scores indicate that two further matches must be played and won (teams that lost their first quarter final match).
 A score in italics indicates a match decided on a tie-breaker question.

First round

Highest Scoring Losers play-offs

Second round

Quarter-finals

Semi-finals

Final

 The trophy and title were awarded to the Manchester team comprising David Brice, Adam Barr, Richard Gilbert and Debbie Brown.
 The trophy was presented by the Astronomer Royal Martin Rees.

Spin-off: Christmas Special 2012
Each year, a Christmas special sequence is aired featuring distinguished alumni. Out of 7 first-round winners, the top 4 highest-scoring teams progress to the semi-finals. The teams consist of  celebrities who represent their alma maters.

Results
Winning teams are highlighted in bold.
Teams with green scores (winners) returned in the next round, while those with red scores (losers) were eliminated.
Teams with grey scores won their match but did not achieve a high enough score to proceed to the next round.
A score in italics indicates a match decided on a tie-breaker question.

First Round

Standings for the winners

Semi-finals

Final

The New College, Oxford team of Rachel Johnson, Patrick Gale, Kate Mosse and Yan Wong beat the University of East Anglia team of John Boyne, Razia Iqbal, David Grossman and Charlie Higson.

References

External links
 University Challenge Homepage
 Blanchflower Results Table

2013
2012 British television seasons
2013 British television seasons